Mauricio de la Lama (born 11 December 1919, date of death unknown) was a Mexican sailor. He competed at the 1960 Summer Olympics and the 1964 Summer Olympics.

References

External links
 

1919 births
Year of death missing
Mexican male sailors (sport)
Olympic sailors of Mexico
Sailors at the 1960 Summer Olympics – Star
Sailors at the 1964 Summer Olympics – Dragon
Sportspeople from Mexico City